Țaga (Hungarian: Cege; German: Zegen) is a commune in Cluj County, Transylvania, Romania. It is composed of five villages: Năsal (Noszoly), Sântejude (Vasasszentegyed), Sântejude-Vale (Vasasszentegyedi völgy), Sântioana (Vasasszentiván), and Țaga.

Geography
The commune is located in the eastern part of the county, having as neighbors: to the east Bistrița-Năsăud County and Chiochiș commune, to the south Geaca and Pălatca communes, to the west Sic commune, and to the north Fizeșu Gherlii and Sânmartin communes. Țaga is crossed by the county road DJ 109C Cămărașu–Gherla, a road that connects the national roads Apahida-Reghin and the national road Cluj-Napoca–Gherla–Dej.

Demographics 
According to the census from 2002 there was a total population of 2,162 people living in this commune. Of this population, 91.67% are ethnic Romanians, 6.15% are ethnic Hungarians, and 2.12% ethnic Romani.

Natives
 Ioan Chezan
 Ioan-Aurel Pop

See also

References

 Atlasul localităților județului Cluj (Cluj County Localities Atlas), Suncart Publishing House, Cluj-Napoca, 

Communes in Cluj County
Localities in Transylvania